Heinz Betz (born 29 September 1954) is a German former professional racing cyclist. He most notably won the bronze medal in the points race at the 1980 UCI Track Cycling World Championships. He also competed on the road, notably riding in the 1980 Giro d'Italia.

His brother Werner was also a professional cyclist.

References

External links
 

1954 births
Living people
German male cyclists
German track cyclists
Sportspeople from Stuttgart
Cyclists from Baden-Württemberg